Beau Hunks is a 1931 American Pre-Code Laurel and Hardy film, directed by James W. Horne. The title is a reference to the Beau Geste trilogy (Beau Geste (1924), Beau Sabreur (1926) and Beau Ideal (1927) and the Hollywood films of the same period based on them); to the line in Beau Sabreur where Buddy says '"Sure thing, Son Hank — if a gang of Touareg Bohunks couldn't, French troops couldn't. . . . I s'pose it is us he's after?"'; or to bohunk, a common ethnic slur of the time in the United States. At 37 minutes, it is the longest Laurel and Hardy short. The French Foreign Legion scenario was reused in The Flying Deuces with Charles B. Middleton again playing their commanding officer.

Plot
A lovesick Ollie sings and plays piano for his absent sweetheart Jeanie-Weenie (only ever seen as a photograph) before revealing to Stan that he is to marry her. No sooner does he make this announcement than the postman delivers a Dear John letter from Jeanie-Weenie. A heartbroken Ollie announces that the pair of them will join the French Foreign Legion as it is the only place where he can forget her. When they arrive at the barracks in French Algeria, they discover that not only are all the other soldiers also trying to forget lost loves but they are all trying to forget the same one that Ollie had: Jeanie-Weenie! This gives Ollie the revelation that she was not worthy of his love from the beginning.

An attempt by the pair to resign from the Legion is angrily rejected by the camp commander and the entire platoon is sent on a forced march. A scout enters the camp in a hurry to say that Legion fortress Fort Arid is to be besieged by native Riffian tribesmen, and the garrison is sent to defend it. The duo get cut off from the rest of the regiment in a sandstorm but reach the fortress before the others. Surprisingly, with the aid of barrels of nails, the boys defeat the Riffians by themselves and the leader of the Riffians is revealed to be yet another of Jeanie-Weenie's conquests.

Cast

Hal Roach's Favorite Movie
In January 1992, seven days after Hal Roach celebrated his hundredth birthday, the centenarian appeared as a guest on The Tonight Show. On that occasion, Jay Leno was subbing for host Johnny Carson. When Leno asked Roach which of the movies he had made was his favorite, he selected Beau Hunks. Roach said it was strictly because "leading lady" Jean Harlow—who had started at Roach's studio but had moved on to become a star at MGM—appeared in Beau Hunks for nothing. Harlow "appeared" in the film only through old publicity photographs for the Roach studio.

The Dutch musical group
A Dutch musical ensemble, named The Beau Hunks Orchestra after that film, was formed in early 1992 for the purpose of performing some of the soundtrack music at an Oliver Hardy centennial celebration in Amsterdam. They went on to release a number of recordings of the film music of Leroy Shield and some other composers, notably Raymond Scott.

References

External links
 
 
 
 
 
 Beau Hunks Orchestra in rehearsal, 2007

1931 films
1931 comedy films
1931 short films
American black-and-white films
Films directed by James W. Horne
Films about the French Foreign Legion
Laurel and Hardy (film series)
Military humor in film
Films with screenplays by H. M. Walker
Films set in deserts
1930s English-language films
1930s American films